Cooperville is an unincorporated community in Screven County, in the U.S. state of Georgia.

History
The first settlement at Cooperville was made ca. 1790 by William Cooper.

References

Unincorporated communities in Screven County, Georgia
Unincorporated communities in Georgia (U.S. state)